The 1927 college football season ended with the Illini of the University of Illinois (7–0–1) being recognized as champion under the Dickinson System.  At season's end, the Rissler Cup was awarded to the team that finished first in the "Dickinson ratings", which considered strength of schedule, in that a win, loss or tie against a "strong" opponent was worth more than one against a lesser team, and the results were averaged.

In the final week, Georgia's "Dream and Wonder team" was upset by Georgia Tech. Georgia had upset Eastern power Yale 14–10. Though most selectors retrospectively named either Illinois or Georgia as their 1927 national champions, over a half-century later Jeff Sagarin, a computer-based selector, named Dana X. Bible's Texas Aggies as the No. 1 team. 

In the Rose Bowl, the Pittsburgh Panthers (8–0–1) were invited to play against the Pacific Coast Conference champion.  Though USC and Stanford had identical records in conference play, Stanford was given a chance to "avenge" its 7–7 tie against Alabama in the previous year's Rose Bowl. Stanford won 7–6.

Rule changes
The major rules change in 1927 was the moving of the goal posts from the goal line, to the end of the end zone, where they have been ever since.  The move was for both safety reasons and to de-emphasize the kicking game

Conference and program changes

Conference changes
Three conferences began play in 1927:
Arkansas Association – active through the 1929 season
Arkansas Intercollegiate Conference – an NAIA conference active through the 1994 season
Smoky Mountain Conference – active through the 1957 season
One conference played its final season in 1927:
Kansas Collegiate Athletic Conference – active since the 1890 season; previously known as the Kansas Collegiate Athletic Association and Kansas College Athletic Conference; replaced by a conference with the same name that is an active NAIA conference
Two conferences changed in their name in 1927:
The Inter-Normal Athletic Conference of Wisconsin changed its name to the Wisconsin State Teachers College Conference, the name it would retain through the 1951 season
The Nebraska Intercollegiate Conference changed its name to the Nebraska College Athletic Conference, the name it would retain until its dissolution after the 1976 season.

Program changes
 Bowling Green Normal College officially changed their nickname from the Normals, adopting their present moniker, the Falcons.
After Oregon Agricultural College changed its name to Oregon State Agricultural College, the Oregon Agricultural Aggies became the Oregon State Aggies.

September 
September 17 Washington defeated Willamette 32–6.  
September 24 USC beat Occidental 33–0; Army beat Boston University, 13–0; Pittsburgh beat Thiel College 42–0.  Texas A&M shut out Trinity 45–0.

October
October 1  USC beat Santa Clara 52–12.  Notre Dame beat Iowa's Coe College 28–7;  Army beat Detroit Mercy 6–0.  Yale beat Bowdoin 41–0;

The Western Conference (later the Big Ten) teams opened their seasons.  Minnesota beat North Dakota, 57–10, Michigan beat Ohio Wesleyan, 33–0, and Illinois beat Bradley, 19–0.
Pittsburgh beat Grove City College, 33–0; Nebraska beat Iowa State, 6–0; Georgia beat Virginia, 32–0; and Texas A&M beat Southwest Texas 31–0.

October 8 USC edged Oregon State 13–12; Detroit Mercy, fresh from its 6–0 loss at West Point, played at Notre Dame and lost 20–0; Army beat Marquette 21–12; 
In a battle of Bulldogs, Georgia beat Yale 14–10 in New Haven.  Pittsburgh won another shutout, over West Virginia, 49–0;

Minnesota beat Oklahoma State, 40–0, Michigan beat Michigan State, 21–0, and Illinois beat Butler 58–0.  At Columbia, Missouri, Missouri beat Nebraska, 7–6, and Texas A&M recorded its third shutout, an 18–0 win over Sewanee.

October 15 USC played at Stanford University in Palo Alto, to a 13–13 tie.
Notre Dame and Navy played at Baltimore, with the Irish winning 19–6.
Army beat Davis & Elkins College, 27–6
Yale beat Brown 19–0; 
In Western Conference play, Minnesota and Indiana played to a 14–14 tie
Michigan won at Wisconsin, 14–0, Illinois and Iowa State played to a 12–12 tie, 
Pittsburgh beat Drake 32–0; 
Nebraska beat Grinnell College 58–0
Furman v. Georgia took place in Athens, Ga., as the University of Georgia hosted the Paladins of Furman University and won, 32–0.
Texas A&M surrendered its first points in a 40–6 win over Arkansas.

October 22 USC beat Caltech 51–0 ; 
Notre Dame beat Indiana 19–6
(4–0) 
Army and (2–1) Yale met at New Haven, with Yale winning 10–6
Minnesota beat Iowa, 38–0
Michigan beat Ohio State, 21–0, 
Brown was upset by Lebanon Valley, 13–12
Illinois edged Northwestern, 7–6
Pittsburgh beat crosstown team Carnegie Tech, but not in a shutout (23–7).
Nebraska was idle; Georgia beat Auburn, 33–3
Texas A&M played at Texas Christian, and was tied, 0–0.

October 29 Michigan (4–0–0) and Illinois (3–0–1) faced off at Champaign, Ill.  The Illini won 14–0.

USC beat California, 13–0
Notre Dame beat Georgia Tech, 26–7
Army beat Bucknell 34–0; 
Yale beat Dartmouth, 19–0;
Minnesota beat Wisconsin, 13–7; 
Pittsburgh beat Allegheny 62–0; 
Nebraska beat visiting Syracuse, 21–0; Georgia beat Tulane, 31–0
Texas A&M had beaten Texas Tech, 47–6, in a Friday game.

November
November 5  USC was idle, while (5–1–1) Stanford and (7–0–0) Washington met in Seattle for a conference game, with Stanford winning 13–7.

In a meeting of unbeatens, (5–0–0) Notre Dame hosted (4–0–1) Minnesota.  The teams played to a 7–7 tie.

Army beat Franklin & Marshall, 45–0; 
Yale beat Maryland 30–6
Michigan won at Chicago, 14–0 and Illinois beat Iowa 14–0
Pittsburgh and Washington & Jefferson, both (6–0–0), played to a 0–0 tie
Nebraska beat Kansas, 47–13; 
Georgia defeated Florida at Jacksonville, 28–0; Texas A&M beat SMU, 39–13

On Armistice Day, November 11, Texas A&M defeated Rice University in Houston, 14–0.

November 12  USC beat Colorado 46–7; 
(6–1–0) Army faced off against (5–0–1) Notre Dame at Yankee Stadium.  The Cadets handed Rockne's team its first defeat, 18–0

Yale beat Princeton 14–6; 
Minnesota beat Drake 27–6; 
Michigan beat Navy 27–12; 
Illinois beat Chicago 15–6; Georgia beat Clemson, 32–0
(6–0–1) Pittsburgh and (4–1–0) Nebraska faced off in Pittsburgh, with the Panthers winning 21–13

November 19 USC defeated Washington State, 27–0, while Stanford beat visiting California, 13–6 to close their season at 8–2–1.  Though USC, at 8–1–1, had the better overall record, Stanford's two losses at been outside the conference, to St. Mary's and to Santa Clara, and they had tied USC.  In PCC play, Stanford and USC both finished 4–0–1, and either could have been invited to play in the 1928 Rose Bowl.  The Rose Bowl committee went with Stanford, which had been tied by Alabama in the 1927 New Year's Day game.

Notre Dame beat Drake University in Des Moines, 32–0.  Drake, which played against Navy, Pitt, Minnesota, Notre Dame and UCLA, would finish at 3–6–0 
Army beat Ursinus College 13–0; Yale closed its season hosting Harvard, and won 14–0; 
Illinois defeated Ohio State, 13–0
At Ann Arbor, (5–0–2) Minnesota visited (6–1–0) Michigan.  The Gophers beat the Wolverines 13–7 to close their seasons.  Nebraska won at Kansas State, 33–0 
Georgia beat Mercer, 26–7

November 24 On Thanksgiving Day, Pittsburgh beat Penn State, 30–0.  Pitt, with a record of 8–0–1, had outscored its opponents 283 to 20, with seven shutouts, and was selected to meet Stanford in the Rose Bowl.
 
Nebraska beat visiting New York University, 27–18; Texas A&M closed its season with a 28–7 win over Texas.

November 26 Notre Dame (6–1–1) and USC (7–0–1) played before an estimated record crowd of 123,000 (Reported as 117,000 in the Chicago Tribune) at Soldier Field in Chicago, with Notre Dame winning 7–6 (on the strength of a blocked extra point attempt) to hand the Trojans their first loss.

In the Army–Navy Game, played before a crowd of 70,000 at the Polo Grounds in New York, Army came back from 9–0 at halftime to win 14–9.  In Birmingham, Georgia beat Alabama, 20–6.

In the Army–Navy Game, played before a crowd of 70,000 at the Polo Grounds in New York, Army came back from 9–0 at halftime to win 14–9.  In Birmingham, Georgia beat Alabama, 20–6.

(9–0–0) Georgia faced off against (7–1–1) Georgia Tech in Atlanta to close the season.  The Yellow Jackets undid the Bulldogs' hopes for a perfect season, winning 12–0

Rose Bowl

As the only post-season college football game, the Rose Bowl sought an East-West matchup between the best available eastern team and the PCC champion.  In 1927, the Pitt Panthers had finished the season at 8–0–1, with seven shutouts against various levels of opposition, while Stanford had won the Pacific Coast Conference going 8–2–1.  Since January 1, 1928, fell on a Sunday, the game was played on Monday, January 2.  Stanford Punter Frankie Wilton had been the "goat" of the 1927 Rose Bowl, after an Alabama defender broke through the line, blocked his kick, and set up the Tide's tying touchdown.  Wilton lost the ball after being hit on his own 20 yard line, and Pitt's Jimmy Hagan ran the fumble in for a touchdown.  Walter Heinecke of Stanford blocked the point attempt, holding Pitt's lead to 6–0.  Wilton's chance at redemption came later, when his teammate Spud Lewis fumbled a yard from goal.  Wilton scooped up the ball and crashed through for the tying touchdown.  The Stanford kick was good, and the Indians held on for a 7–6 win.

National championship
Texas A&M was awarded the 1927 national championship. Georgia's "Dream and Wonder team" was also chosen a national champion. They defeated Yale, another choice for national champion.

Conference standings

Major conference standings

Independents

Minor conferences

Minor conference standings

Dickinson System
The AP sportswriters' poll would not begin continuously until 1936. (although, the first time was a one instance publishing in 1934)  Frank G. Dickinson, an economics professor at the University of Illinois, had invented the Dickinson System to rank colleges based upon their records and the strength of their opposition.  The system was originally designed to rank teams in the Big Nine (later the Big Ten) conference.  Chicago clothing manufacturer Jack Rissman then persuaded Dickinson to rank the nation's teams under the system, and awarded the Rissman Trophy to the winning university.   

Although Dickinson retroactively applied the system to the 1924 and 1925 seasons, the year 1926 was the first in which the trophy was awarded at season's end.  The system awarded 30 points for a win over a "strong team", and 20 for a win over a "weak team".  Losses were awarded points (15 for loss to a strong team, 10 for loss to a weak team).  Ties were treated as half a win and half a loss (22.5 for a tie with a strong team, 15 for a tie with a weak team).  An average was then derived by dividing the points by games played.

Final Dickinson rankings

Awards and honors

All-Americans

The consensus All-America team included:

Statistical leaders
Player scoring most points: Jimmy Armistead, Vanderbilt, 138
Total offense leader: Bill Spears, Vanderbilt, 2001

References